Laurie Doran was an Australian rugby league footballer who played in the 1940s. He played in the NSWRFL premiership for North Sydney and Newtown as a second rower.

Playing career
Doran began his first grade career in 1942 with Norths and played in the 1943 NSWRL grand final defeat against Newtown in front of a crowd of 60,922 which was a record attendance for a grand final at the time. In 1947, Doran played one season with Newtown and his final game in first grade was the semi-final defeat against Canterbury-Bankstown. Doran also played representative football for NSW City featuring in one game during the 1944 season.

Coaching career
Doran coached his former club North Sydney for 1 season in 1951 as the side finished last on the table claiming the wooden spoon.

References

Newtown Jets players
North Sydney Bears coaches
North Sydney Bears players
Rugby league second-rows
Year of birth missing
Year of death missing
Rugby league players from Sydney